Cueibet County is an administrative area in Lakes State, South Sudan.

References

Counties of South Sudan